Lesotho Passports are issued to citizens of Lesotho to travel outside the country.

See also

Visa requirements for Lesotho citizens
 List of passports

External links

 http://www.foreign.gov.ls

Passports by country
Law of Lesotho
Foreign relations of Lesotho
Lesotho and the Commonwealth of Nations